The 2007–08 season was the 60th season in the existence of FC Steaua București and the club's 60th consecutive season in the top flight of Romanian football. In addition to the domestic league, Steaua București participated in this season's edition of the Cupa României and the UEFA Champions League.

Players

Transfers

In

Out

Loan out

Statistics

Player stats

|-
|colspan="11"|Players sold or loaned out during the season
|-

|}

Sources:

Competitions

Overall record

Liga I

League table

Results summary

Results by round

Matches

Cupa României

Results

UEFA Champions League

Qualifying rounds

Second qualifying round

Third qualifying round

Group stage

Results

Staff

Management
 Manager: Gheorghe Hagi (resigned), Massimo Pedrazzini (sacked), Marius Lăcătuș
 Assistant managers: Mihai Teja, Ioan Naghi, Massimo Pedrazzini
 Goalkeeping coach: Andrei Speriatu
 Fitness Coach: Horea Codorean
 Medic: Radu Paligora
 Masseur: Cătălin Fandel

Administration
 President: Valeriu Argăseală
 Vicepresident: Iulian Ghiorghișor
 Scouting manager: Mario Branco
 Marketing director: Andreea Chiriloiu
 Press Officer: Cătălin Făiniși

Board Room
 Chairman: George Becali
 Vice-Chairman: Teia Sponte
 Board Room Members: Lucian Becali, Vasile Geambazi
 Censor: Victor Manole, Mariana Istudor
 Supplementary Censors: Virgil Laurențiu Găman, Maria Apostoiu
 Stock Holders: Vasile Geambazi (37%), Constantin Geambazi (30%), Cătălin Ciubotă (26%), Tomaida Bădescu (4%), Marius Ianuli (3%)

Youth Centre staff
 General manager: Leonard Strizu
 Coordinator: Gigel Gheorghe
 Physiotherapist: George Mărculescu
 Fitness Coach: Ciprian Prună

Notes and references

Notes

References

FC Steaua București seasons
Steaua Bucuresti